Vasilyevsky is a rural locality (a khutor) in Semichenskoye Rural Settlement, Kotelnikovsky District, Volgograd Oblast, Russia. The population was 28 as of 2010.

Geography 
Vasilyevsky is located in steppe, 23 km southwest of Kotelnikovo (the district's administrative centre) by road. Semichny is the nearest rural locality.

References 

Rural localities in Kotelnikovsky District